Siledik, Kırkağaç is a town in the district of Kırkağaç, Manisa Province, in the Aegean region of Turkey.

History
The ancient name of the village is Stratonikea Mysia. Founded in the Seleucid Empire, it was named after the Stratonikea in western Anatolia. It was one of two such cities. The other, Mugla Yatagan, is located in Kariya Stratonikea, which was established in the name of his wife Mysia.

Archaeology excavations of the ancient town have been started.

Geography 

Climate
The climate of the village is in the Mediterranean climate domain.

Population
Village population data:

Economy
The economy of a village depends on agriculture and husbandry.

In the village, there is a drinking water supply, but there is no sewerage system. There is a post office and a post office branch but no health centers and health posts nor school. The village has asphalt roads connecting the village and electricity and landline telephone.

References

Populated places in Manisa Province